Lynn R Kahle (born 1950) is an American consumer psychologist and Professor Emeritus at the University of Oregon's Lundquist College of Business. From 2018 to 2020 he taught at the Lubin School of Business, Pace University in New York as a visiting scholar and professor.

Life
Kahle grew up in Hillsboro, Oregon, in the Portland metro area and graduated from Concordia College (later Concordia University) in Portland. He then graduated from Pacific Lutheran University in Tacoma, Washington, with a master's degree. He received his Ph.D. from the University of Nebraska and subsequently worked as a post-doctoral fellow at the University of Michigan Institute for Social Research. Kahle joined the University of Oregon in 1983 as a professor teaching in the College of Business. In 1990, he made an unsuccessful run to serve in the Oregon House of Representatives to represent District 43 as a Democrat.

He was the Academic Director of the Applied Information Management (AIM) program at the University of Oregon. He previously served as President of the Society for Consumer Psychology, which he represented on the American Psychological Association (APA) Council of Representatives from 2014 to 2019. He chaired the APA Membership Board in 2019.

Kahle developed the List of Values and has subsequently conducted research on values and lifestyles. He performed as founding academic director of the Warsaw Sports Marketing Center and has done extensive research in sports marketing. He has also studied consumption and sustainability, as well as consumption and religion. He served as Editor in Chief for the APA Handbook of Consumer Psychology.

Work
Kahle has contributed to many concepts in consumer psychology, including:
the match-up hypothesis,
the role-relaxed consumer,
the role of social values in consumption, attitude-behavior consistency,
consumer thought processes, lifestyle marketing,
stimulus condition self-selection,
social media
and sports fandom.

Kahle developed Social Adaptation theory, which maintains that 
people's cognitive life facilitates their functioning in their social 
environments. Communications is most effective when it emphasizes 
connections to a person's values, attitudes, and lifestyles.  Sports 
marketing, for example, most deeply influences people whose 
lifestyle emphasizes sports.  In social adaptation theory people 
actively attend to messages that inform their values. Values shape 
attitudes, which in turn guide behaviors. Social media have encouraged clustering of and interactions among people who share lifestyles and values. This theory has influenced work in marketing communication, global marketing, sports marketing, retailing, and consumer behaviour.

Awards and honors
Kahle has won numerous awards, including the American Marketing Association Lifetime Achievement Award for the Consumer Behavior Special Interest Group, the Stotlar Award for the Sports Marketing Association, the Distinguished Career Contributions to the Scientific Understanding of Sports Business from the American Marketing Association Sports Special Interest Group, and the Stewart Distinguished Professor Award from the University of Oregon.

Bibliography

Selected Publications
 Kahle, Lynn R., Lowrey, Tina, and Huber, Joel  (Eds.).  (2022).  APA Handbook of Consumer Psychology.  Washington, DC:  American Psychological Association.  
 Kahle, Lynn R., and Eda Gurel-Atay, Eds. (2014). Communicating Sustainability for the Green Economy. Armonk, NY: M.E. Sharpe. 
 Minton, Elizabeth, and Lynn R. Kahle (2014). Belief Systems, Religion, and Behavioral Economics: Marketing in Multicultural Environments. New York, NY: Business Expert Press. 160 pages. .
 Stockard, Jean, Gaylene Carpenter, and Lynn R. Kahle (2014).  "Continuity and Change in Values in Midlife:  Testing the Age Stability Hypothesis," Experimental Aging Research, 40, 1-21.
 Gurel-Atay, Eda, Guang-Xin Xie, Johnny Chen, and Lynn R. Kahle (2010).  "Changes in Social Values in the United States, 1976-2007."  Journal of Advertising Research, 50(1), 57–67.
 Kahle, Lynn R., Raymond Liu, Gregory M. Rose, and Woo-Sung Kim (2000).  "Dialectical Thinking in Consumer Decision Making." Journal of Consumer Psychology, 9(1), 53-58
 Homer, Pamela M. and Lynn R. Kahle (1988). "A Structural Equation Test of the Value-Attitude-Behavior Hierarchy," Journal of Personality and Social Psychology, 54(April), 638–646.
 Kahle, Lynn R., Ed. (1983). Social Values and Social Change:  Adaptation to Life in America.  New York: Praeger.

References

21st-century American psychologists
University of Oregon faculty
1950 births
Living people
People from Hillsboro, Oregon
University of Nebraska alumni
University of Michigan alumni
Pacific Lutheran University alumni
Concordia University (Oregon) alumni
Oregon Democrats
20th-century American psychologists